Kaitlyn Aurelia Smith is an American composer, performer and producer, originally from the Pacific Northwest and currently based in Los Angeles. Her work prominently employs Buchla modular synthesizers. She received acclaim for her albums Ears (2016) and The Kid (2017). She has collaborated with Suzanne Ciani and Emile Mosseri.

Early life and education
Smith grew up and was home-educated on Orcas Island, Northwestern Washington. She left the island to study composition and sound engineering at Berklee College of Music in Boston, before returning to the island after her graduation. Smith performed in the indie folk duo Ever Isles while still at Berklee. 

It was after returning home that Smith discovered synthesizers, when a neighbor who shared her interest in Terry Riley introduced her to the Buchla 100 Synthesizer. Having originally intended to use her voice as her primary instrument, and then moving to classical guitar and piano, Smith switched to the use of synthesizer after being lent and experimenting with the Buchla 100 for a year, explaining, "I got so distracted and enamored with the process of making sounds with [the Buchla's] that I abandoned the next Ever Isles album." She also frequently uses the Buchla Music Easel.

Smith contributed sound design work to the music video for Panda Bear's "Boys Latin" in 2014. In 2015, she signed to independent record label Western Vinyl and released her first official album, Euclid. In 2016, she received acclaim for her 2016 album Ears and collaborated with synthesizer-based composer Suzanne Ciani on a RVNG Intl. release entitled Sunergy. Her album, The Mosaic of Transformation, was released in May 2020.

Musical approach
Smith's music makes prominent use of Buchla synthesizers, specifically the Buchla 100 and Musical Easel. She stated that "there’s a lot of room for happy accidents with a Buchla synthesizer because it’s not very predictable. If you turn on a light in the room that you’re working in or if the grounding isn’t properly grounded or if you plug in something else, all of a sudden something will change. That gives me this feeling of working with a life, and that there is a biofeedback, more so than a predictable synthesizer." She has stated that "I try and blend in as many different tones / timbres as possible […] I like to imagine what that sound would feel like if I were to touch it and vice versa."

Discography

Studio albums
Cows Will Eat the Weeds (2012, self-released)
Useful Trees (2012, self-released)
Tides (2014, Western Vinyl)
Euclid (2015, Western Vinyl)
Ears (2016, Western Vinyl)
Sunergy with Suzanne Ciani (2016, RVNG Intl.)
The Kid (2017, Western Vinyl)
The Mosaic of Transformation (2020, Ghostly International)
I Could Be Your Dog (Prequel) with Emile Mosseri (2021, Ghostly International)
Let's Turn It Into Sound (2022, Ghostly International)

Singles
"Swan" (2012)
"Milk" (2012)
"Anthropoda"
"Riparian" (2016)
"An Intention" (2017)
"To Follow and Lead" (2017)
"I Will Make Room for You (Four Tet Remix)" (2017)
"Expanding Electricity" (2019)
"Lagoon" (2019)
"Log in Your Fire" with Emile Mosseri (2020)

Original scores
 Fortraits
 DIY TV
 Cabin Porn 
 Reggie Watts - Brasilia City of the Future
 First People
 Elf Help
 Google - The Hidden Worlds of the National Parks

Remixes

References

External links

Kaitlyn Aurelia Smith on Western Vinyl
Kaitlyn Aurelia Smith on MusicBrainz
Kaitlyn Aurelia Smith on Discogs

1987 births
Living people
Ableton Live users
American electronic musicians
Record producers from Washington (state)
21st-century American composers
American women in electronic music
American women record producers
21st-century American women musicians
21st-century women composers
Western Vinyl artists